Ebenezer may refer to:

Bible
 Eben-Ezer, a place mentioned in the Books of Samuel

People
 Ebenezer (given name), a male given name

Places

Australia
 Ebenezer, New South Wales
 Ebenezer, Queensland, a locality in the City of Ipswich
 Ebenezer, South Australia

Canada
 Ebenezer, Prince Edward Island, a historic place in Queens County, Prince Edward Island
 Ebenezer, Saskatchewan

United States
 Ebenezer, Georgia
 Ebenezer, Muhlenberg County, Kentucky
 Ebenezer, Mississippi
 Ebenezer, Missouri
 Ebenezer, New York
 Ebenezer, Ohio
 Ebenezer, Pennsylvania
 Ebenezer, Camp County, Texas
 Ebenezer, Jasper County, Texas
 Ebenezer, Virginia
 Ebenezer, Wisconsin

Other uses
 Ebenezer (film), a 1997 Canadian television film
 Ebenezer (hymn), a Welsh tune to which many hymns are set

See also
 Ebenezer Church (disambiguation)
 Ebenezer Colonies, New York
 Ebenhaeser, South Africa
 New Ebenezer, New York
 Ebenezer Floppen Slopper's Wonderful Water slides, an abandoned waterpark in Illinois
 The Book of Ebenezer Le Page, a novel by Gerald Basil Edwards
 "Ebeneezer Goode", a 1992 song by the Shamen
 "Come Thou Fount of Every Blessing", a hymn written by Robert Robinson in 1758